Mike Lange (born March 3, 1948) is a retired American sportscaster, best known for his long career as a play-by-play announcer for Pittsburgh Penguins hockey. In 2001, he received the Foster Hewitt Memorial Award for his outstanding work as an NHL broadcaster.

Career
In 1969, while attending  Sacramento State University, Lange was encouraged by his friend to attend a hockey game. At the time, Lange had never attended a hockey game before.

From there, Lange worked in the penalty box at local arenas, coordinating the penalty time with the PA announcer. He eventually replaced the PA announcer after he asked for a raise and his play-by-play was broadcast over the college radio station.

Lange joined the Penguins as a radio announcer in 1974 after spending time as a commentator for the San Diego Gulls and Phoenix Roadrunners of the Western Hockey League. He left the Penguins after just one season, because the team was in bankruptcy and he had no guarantee of a job. Lange called Washington Diplomats soccer games, then returned to the Penguins for the 1976–77 season, where he became the central figure of the team's broadcast presence.

From 1976 until 2006, Lange served as the lead play-by-play announcer for the Penguins' radio and television network, never missing a broadcast.  In 2001, Lange was the recipient of the Foster Hewitt Memorial Award for his outstanding work as an NHL broadcaster. On June 29, 2006, citing a desire to go in a new direction, Fox Sports Pittsburgh (now AT&T SportsNet Pittsburgh) did not exercise the option year on Lange's contract.  He was replaced by his longtime radio partner, Paul Steigerwald, in a move that was extremely unpopular with fans. On taking Lange's spot Steigerwald said, "I'm not going to try to replace him. I think he's irreplaceable."

On August 4, 2006, Lange signed a contract to work on Penguins' radio broadcasts. On October 8, 2019, prior to a game against the Winnipeg Jets, Lange was presented with an autographed personalized jersey to commemorate his 45th year. 

During the mid-1980s, Lange also broadcast several NHL games for ESPN. In 1986 and 1987, he also called Pittsburgh Pirates baseball games on cable television.

Lange and then-colleague Steigerwald appeared together as themselves in the 1995 movie Sudden Death, starring Jean-Claude Van Damme.  In the film, Lange used many of his trademark expressions in his play-by-play commentary.

On August 9, 2021, the Pittsburgh Penguins announced that Lange would be retiring after a 46-year career with the Penguins.

Expressions 

Like fellow Pittsburgh sports announcers, the late Steelers announcer Myron Cope, the late Pirates announcer Bob Prince, former Pirates announcer Lanny Frattare, and current Pirates announcer Greg Brown, Lange uses a repertoire of distinctive colorful expressions, sometimes called "Lange-isms" by his fans.  While some are familiar phrases from pop culture, most are cryptic expressions of Lange's making.

KDKA-AM radio talk show host Fred Honsberger used to play a personalized clip of Lange saying, "Ladies and Gentlemen, the Honz has just left the building!" at the end of his radio show.

References

External links
Pens Universe Interviews Mike Lange
The Official Mike Lange Soundboard
The Official Mike Lange Soundboard Android app
Ladies and gentlemen, Mike Lange has left the building

1948 births
Living people
American radio sports announcers
American television sports announcers
California State University, Sacramento alumni
Foster Hewitt Memorial Award winners
Major League Baseball broadcasters
National Hockey League broadcasters
North American Soccer League (1968–1984) commentators
Pittsburgh Penguins announcers
Pittsburgh Pirates announcers
People from Sacramento, California